Gerronema is a genus of small- to medium-sized lignicolous agarics with white, nonamyloid, spores and decurrent gills. The genus was circumscribed by American mycologist Rolf Singer in 1951.

Description
Typically the cap of the fruit bodies have a shallow to deep central depression, giving the umbrella-like to funnel-shaped caps the appearance of a belly button, or a belly with a navel. Similarly shaped agarics are said to be omphalinoid in appearance in reference to a morphologically similar genus, Omphalina. Gerronema differ from Omphalina by the absence of incrusting or intraparietal pigments typical of Omphalina, the occasional occurrence of bright colors, such as yellow or green absent in Omphalina, by the restriction to decay of wood, and by the tough tissues composed of sarcodimitic hyphae.

Distribution
The species have a primarily tropical distribution, but also occur in Europe and eastern North America where they fruit during hot muggy, summer weather. One of the most common species in the eastern United States is Gerronema strombodes .

Species
, Index Fungorum lists 55 species in Gerronema: and a new combination was published in 2019.

G. aconquijense
G. albidum
G. albogriseolum
G. alutaceum
G. amabile
G. atrialba
G. bethlehemicum
G. brunneum
G. bryogeton
G. calongei
G. candidum
G. chrysocarpum
G. chrysocraspedum
G. cinctum
G. citrinum
G. collybiomorphum
G. corticiphilum
G. costaricense
G. cyathiforme
G. daamsii
G. daguense
G. farinolens
G. fibula 

G. flammeum
G. glutinipes
G. hungo
G. incarnatum
G. infumatum
G. josserandii
G. laccarioides
G. longipes
G. majus
G. mariae
G. melanomphax
G. moseri
G. nemorale
G. nitriolens
G. oligophyllum
G. pantoxanthum
G. pseudomurale
G. reclinis
G. sanguineum
G. schusteri
G. sericeum
G. stevensonii
G. strombodes
G. subchrysophyllum
G. subclavatum
G. suboreades
G. subsericellum
G. sucrense
G. tenue
G. theophili
G. umbilicatum
G. virgineum
G. viridilucens (bioluminescent)
G. xanthophyllum

See also

List of Agaricales genera
List of Marasmiaceae genera

References

External links
Gerronema (Google Images) 

Marasmiaceae
Agaricales genera
Taxa named by Rolf Singer